Francisco J. Quintana (born April 30, 1974) is an Argentinean-American immunologist and neuroscientist, and Professor of Neurology at Harvard Medical School. His lab studies interactions between the immune system and nervous system. He is best known for his work on the regulation of inflammation by astrocytes, and by the study of the role of the Aryl Hydrocarbon Receptor in the regulation of the immune response by pollutants, the microbial flora and metabolism. Dr. Quintana's research has implications for our understanding of the pathology of multiple inflammatory disorders including multiple sclerosis, Type 1 diabetes and Inflammatory Bowel Disease, and also brain tumors and infectious diseases. His work has also led to the development of novel therapeutic interventions.

Education and career 
Dr. Quintana received his Diploma in Biology from the University of Buenos Aires. He received his PhD in Immunology from the Weizmann Institute of Science in 2004, where he was advised by Dr. Irun Cohen. Dr. Quintana joined Brigham and Women's Hospital and Harvard Medical School as a postdoctoral fellow in 2005 where he was advised by Dr. Howard L. Weiner. In 2018, Dr. Quintana was appointed Professor of Neurology with tenure. Dr. Quintana is also an Associate Member of the Broad Institute of MIT and Harvard. Dr. Quintana is the president of International Society of Neuroimmunology (2021–2023).

Research 
Quintana's research investigates signaling pathways that control the immune response and neurodegeneration, with the ultimate goal of identifying novel therapeutic targets and biomarkers for immune-mediated disorders. Dr. Quintana has published over 150 peer reviewed articles and book chapters. Dr. Quintana's work identified important roles for the transcription factor AHR in the control of inflammation driven adaptive and innate immune cells. His work also identified important mechanisms that control neurodegeneration and provided the basis for the development of three biotechnology companies.

Awards 
Dr. Quintana has received multiple awards including the Lady Anne Chain Prize for Academic and Scientific Achievements (2004), the Junior Investigator Award from the National MS Society for Outstanding Research (2008), the NIH Pathway to Independence Award (2009), the Nature Publications Award for Outstanding Research Achievements (2009), the Harry Weaver Research Scholar Award (2014), the Harvard Medical School Young Mentor Award (2016), the Milestone in MS Research Award (2017), the American Association of Immunologists-BD Biosciences Investigator Award (2019), ISI Most Highly Cited List since 2019, and the Barancik Prize for Innovation in MS Research (2020).  Dr. Quintana is the Indirawati Kuchroo and Charlotte Weiner Distinguished Professor of Neuroimmunology (2021).

Articles 
1.  Quintana, FJ, Gerber, D., Kent, S.C., Cohen, I.R. & Shai, Y. HIV-1 fusion peptide targets the TCR and inhibits antigen-specific T cell activation. Journal of Clinical Investigation 115, 2149-2158 (2005).

2.  Quintana, FJ, Basso, A.S., Iglesias, A.H., Korn, T., Farez, M.F., Bettelli, E., Caccamo, M., Oukka, M. & Weiner, H.L. Control of T(reg) and T(H)17 cell differentiation by the aryl hydrocarbon receptor. Nature 453, 65-71 (2008).

3. *Farez, M.F., *Quintana F.J., Gandhi, R., Izquierdo, G., Lucas, M. & Weiner, H.L. TLR2 and poly(ADP-ribose) polymerase 1 promote central nervous system neuroinflammation in progressive EAE. Nature Immunology 10, 958-964 (2009).  Corresponding author.

4.  *Apetoh L., *Quintana FJ, *Pot C., Joller N., Xiao S., Kumar D., Burns E.J., Sherr D.H., Weiner H.L. and Kuchroo V.K. The Aryl hydrocarbon Receptor (AhR) interacts with c-Maf to promote the differentiation of IL-27-induced TR1 cells. Nature Immunology 11, 854- 61 (2010).

5.  Gandhi R., Kumar D., Burns E.J., Nadeau M., Dake B., Laroni A., Kozoriz D., Weiner H.L. and Quintana FJ. Aryl hydrocarbon receptor activation induces human Tr1-like and Foxp3+ Treg cells. Nature Immunology 11, 846-53 (2010).

6. Yeste, A., Nadeau, M., Burns, E.J., Weiner, H.L., Quintana, F.J. Nanoparticle-mediated codelivery of myelin antigen and a tolerogenic small molecule suppresses EAE. Proc Natl Acad Sci U S A. 109, 11270-5 (2012).

7.  *Quintana, FJ, *Jin, H., Burns, E.J., Nadeau, M., Yeste, A., Kumar, D., Rangachari, M., Zhu, C., Xiao, S., Seavitt, J., Georgopoulos, K., Kuchroo, V.K. Aiolos promotes T(H)17 differentiation by directly silencing Il2 expression. Nature Immunology 13, 770-7 (2012).

8. Mascanfroni, I.D., Yeste, A., Vieira, S.M., Burns, E.J., Patel, B., Sloma, I., Wu, Y., Mayo, L., Efroni, S., Kuchroo, V.K., Robson, S.C. and Quintana, F.J. IL-27 acts on dendritic cells to suppress the T-cell response and autoimmunity by inducing ENTPD1 (CD39) expression. Nature Immunology 14, 1054-63 (2013).

9.  Yeste, A., Mascanfroni, I.D., Nadeau, M., Burns, E.J., Tukpah, A.M., Santiago, A., Wu, C., Patel, B., Kumar, D., Quintana, FJ. IL-21 induces STAT3-mediated CD4+ T-cell production of IL-22. Nature Communications 6;5, 3753 (2014).

10. Mayo L, Trauger SA, Blain M, Nadeau M, Patel B, Alvarez JI, Mascanfroni ID, Yeste A, Kivisäkk P, Kallas K, Ellezam B, Bakshi R, Prat A, Antel JP, Weiner HL, Quintana F.J. Regulation of astrocyte activation by glycolipids drives chronic CNS inflammation. Nature Medicine 20, 1147-56 (2014).

11.  Mascanfroni ID, Takenaka MC., Yeste A, Patel B, Wu Y, Kenison J, Siddiqui S, Basso AS, Otterbein LE, Pardoll DM, Pan F, Priel A, Clish CB, Robson SC, Quintana FJ. Metabolic control of Tr1 cell differentiation by AHR and HIF1-α. Nature Medicine 21, 638-646 (2015).

12. Farez, M.F., Mascanfroni, I.D., Méndez-Huergo, S., Yeste, A., Murugaiyan, G., Garo, L.P., Balbuena Aguirre, M.E., Patel, B., Ysrraelit, M.C., Zhu, C., Kuchroo, V.K., Rabinovich, G.A., *Quintana, F.J. & *Correale, J. Melatonin contributes to the seasonality of multiple sclerosis relapses. Cell 162:1338-52 (2015). Corresponding and lead author.

13. Yeste, A., Takenaka, M.C., Mascanfroni, I.D., Nadeau, M., Kenison, J.E., Patel, B., Tukpah, A.M., Babon, J.A., DeNicola, M., Kent, S.C., Pozo, D. & Quintana, F.J. Induction of SOCS2 by tolerogenic nanoparticles arrests the diabetogenic T cell response. Science Signaling 9(433):ra61 (2016). Not Federally Funded.

14. Rothhammer V, Mascanfroni ID, Bunse L, Takenaka MC, Kenison J, Mayo L, Chao CC, Patel B, Yan R, Blain M, Alvarez JI, Kébir H, Anandasabapathy N, Izquierdo G, Jung S, Obholzer N, Pochet N, Clish CB, Prinz M, Prat A, Antel J & Quintana FJ. Modulation of astrocyte activity by type I interferon and dietary tryptophan limits inflammation in the central nervous system. Nature Medicine 22, 586-97 (2016).  Not Federally Funded

15. Rothhammer V, Borucki DM, Tjon EC, Takenaka MC, Chao CC, Ardura-Fabregat A, de Lima KA, Gutiérrez-Vázquez C, Hewson P, Staszewski O, Blain M, Healy L, Neziraj T, Borio M, Wheeler M, Dragin LL, Laplaud DA, Antel J, Alvarez JI, Prinz M, Quintana FJ. Microglial control of astrocytes in response to microbial metabolites. Nature 557, 724-728 (2018).

16. Takenaka M.C., Gabriely G., Rothhammer V., Mascanfroni I.D., Wheeler M.A., Chao C.C., Gutiérrez-Vázquez C., Kenison J., Tjon E.C., Barroso A., Vandeventer T., Alves de Lima K., Rothweiler S., Ghannam S., Zandee S., Healy L., Sherr D., Farez M. F., Pratt A., Antel J., Reardon D.A., Zhang H., Robson S.C., Getz G., Weiner H.L. and Quintana F.J. Control of tumor-associated macrophages and T-cells in glioblastoma via AHR and CD39. Nature Neuroscience 22, 729-740 (2019).

17. Wheeler MA, Jaronen M, Covacu R, Zandee SEJ, Scalisi G, Rothhammer V, Tjon EC, Chao CC, Kenison JE, Blain M, Rao VTS, Hewson P, Barroso A, Gutiérrez-Vázquez C, Prat A, Antel JP, Hauser R and Quintana FJ. Environmental control of astrocyte pathogenic activities in CNS inflammation. Cell 176, 581-596 (2019).

18. Chao C-C, Gutiérrez-Vázquez C, Rothhammer V, Mayo L, Wheeler MA, Tjon EC, Zandee SEJ, Blain M, Alves de Lima K, Takenaka MC, Pacheco JA, Hewson P, Liu L, Sanmarco LM, Borucki DM, Lipof GZ, Trauger SA, Clish C, Antel J, Prat A, Quintana FJ. Metabolic control of astrocyte pathogenic activity via cPLA2-MAVS. Cell 179, 1483-1498 (2019).

19. Kenison, J.E., Jhaveri, A., Li, Z., Khadse, N., Tjon, E., Tezza, S., Nowakowska, D., Plasencia, A., Stanton, V.P., Jr., Sherr, D.H., and Quintana, F.J. Tolerogenic nanoparticles suppress central nervous system inflammation. Proc Natl Acad Sci U S A 117, 32017-32028 (2020).

20. Giovannoni F., Bosch I., Polonio M.C., Torti M.F., Wheeler M.A., Li Z., Romorini L., Rodriguez Varela M.S., Rothhammer V., Barroso A., Tjon E. C., Sanmarco L. M., Takenaka M.C, Modaresi S., Gutiérrez-Vázquez C., Ghabdan Zanluqui N., Barreto dos Santos N., Demarchi Munhoz C., Wang Z., Damonte E.B., Sherr D., Gehrke L., Schatzmann Peron J.P., Garcia C.G. and Quintana F.J. AHR is a Zika virus host factor and a candidate target for antiviral therapy. Nature Neuroscience 23, 939-51 (2020).

21. Wheeler MA, Clark IC, Tjon EC, Li Z, Zandee SEJ, Couturier CP, Watson BR, Scalisi G, Alkwai S, Rothhammer V, Rotem A, Heyman JA, Thaploo S, Sanmarco LM, Ragoussis J, Weitz D, Petrecca K, Moffitt JR, Becher B, Antel JP, Prat A, Quintana FJ. Genomic control of astrocytes in multiple sclerosis. Nature. 578, 593-599 (2020).

22. Sanmarco, L. M., Wheeler, M. A., Gutiérrez-Vázquez, C., Polonio, C. M., Linnerbauer, M., Pinho-Ribeiro, F. A., Li, Z., Giovannoni, F., Batterman, K. V., Scalisi, G., Zandee, S., Heck, E. S., Alsuwailm, M., Rosene, D. L., Becher, B., Chiu, I. M., Prat, A., & Quintana, FJ. Gut-licensed IFNγ+ NK cells drive LAMP1+TRAIL+ anti-inflammatory astrocytes. Nature, 590(7846), 473–479 (2021).

23. Clark, I. C., Gutiérrez-Vázquez, C., Wheeler, M. A., Li, Z., Rothhammer, V., Linnerbauer, M., Sanmarco, L. M., Guo, L., Blain, M., Zandee, S., Chao, C. C., Batterman, K. V., Schwabenland, M., Lotfy, P., Tejeda-Velarde, A., Hewson, P., Manganeli Polonio, C., Shultis, M. W., Salem, Y., Tjon, E. C., Fonseca-Castro, P. H., Borucki, D. M., Alves de Lima, K., Plasencia, A., Abate, A. R., Rosene, D. L., Hodgetts, K. J., Prinz, M., Antel, J. P., Prat, A., Quintana, FJ . Barcoded viral tracing of single-cell interactions in central nervous system inflammation. Science, 372(6540), (2021).

24. Scott, B.M., Gutiérrez-Vázquez, C., Sanmarco, L.M., Silva Pereira, J.A, Li, Z., Plasencia, A. Hewson, P., Cox, L.M., O’Brien, M., Chen, S.K., Moraes-Vieira, P.M., Chang, B.S.W., Peisajovich, S.G., Quintana, F.J. Self-Tunable Engineered Yeast Probiotics for the Treatment of Inflammatory Bowel Disease. Nature Medicine 27(7), 1212-1222 (2021).

References 

1974 births
Living people
American immunologists
Harvard Medical School faculty
American neurologists
American medical researchers
Weizmann Institute of Science alumni
University of Buenos Aires alumni